The concept of a gatekeeper state was introduced by Historian Frederick Cooper in his book Africa Since 1940: The Past of the Present. It is used to describe African nations whose main function is balancing the instability of internal political control against the influence of external factors.

Concept 
According to Cooper, African governments suffer from a peculiar politico-economic dysfunction that derives from a particular historical sequence. Specifically, he contends "Africa was systematically conquered but not so systematically ruled" (2002: 196–197) and hence "colonial states had been gate-keeper states" (ibid.: 5) which had "trouble extending their power and their command of people’s respect... inward" (ibid.: 156) but could control "the interface of national and world economies" (ibid.: 141).

Colonial powers mainly sought to extract resources from Africa (e.g. natural resources, labor) which resulted in limited political foundation in territories. Ultimately, the authority of colonial regimes depended on the superior military forces of the metropole, which could easily defeat organized resistance but could neither routinize authority nor gain legitimacy (ibid.: 157).

Over the course of African history, replacement of colonial leaders with native African leaders did little to gain support or stability among constituents.  The survival of each colony therefore still depended on external resources and support, not on internal factors as in established states. Due to weak internal control, this external dependence produced an outward orientation focused on ‘guarding the gate’: gatekeepers collected most of their revenues from taxes on imports and exports, controlled entry and exit visas, distributed foreign aid, decided who could move currency in or out, and issued licenses that determined who could engage in business activities (2002.: 5, 97, 157).

The post-colonial "successor states," Cooper goes on to argue, inherited the mantle of gate-keeper from their former rulers. Independence, however, greatly exacerbated the negative consequences of gate-keeping because whereas before it was taken for granted who would control the gate (along with the power and wealth derived therefrom), in the post-colonial period there was no external military force to impose order.

Furthermore, unlike the colonial powers (at least before the "development era" after about 1940) African rulers wanted to impose their authority internally in order to affect a far-reaching transformation of the economy and society. And given, moreover, that control of the gate was an "either/or phenomenon" (ibid.: 159) or a zero-sum game, the stakes of control were extremely high because the winners gained control of resources they could use to entrench their rule. Consequently, fierce competition for control of the gate arose soon after independence, and this resulted in the collectively irrational political instability that occurred in Africa after independence as evidenced by, among other things, cycles of coups and counter coups.

See also
 List of active separatist movements in Africa

References

Types of countries
Neocolonialism
International development in Africa
Economy of Africa
Economic systems
Postcolonialism
History of colonialism